-1 (TW-1) is an interplanetary mission by the China National Space Administration (CNSA) which sent a robotic spacecraft to Mars, consisting of 6 spacecraft: an orbiter, two deployable cameras, lander, remote camera, and the  rover. The spacecraft, with a total mass of nearly five tons, is one of the heaviest probes launched to Mars and carries 14 scientific instruments. It is the first in a series of planned missions undertaken by CNSA as part of its Planetary Exploration of China program.

The mission's scientific objectives include: investigation of Martian surface geology and internal structure, search for indications of current and past presence of water, and characterization of the space environment and the atmosphere of Mars.

The mission was launched from the Wenchang Spacecraft Launch Site on 23 July 2020 on a Long March 5 heavy-lift launch vehicle. After seven months of transit through the inner Solar System, the spacecraft entered Martian orbit on 10 February 2021. For the next three months the probe studied the target landing sites from a reconnaissance orbit. On 14 May 2021, the lander/rover portion of the mission successfully touched down on Mars, making China the second nation to make a soft landing on and establish communication from the Martian surface, after the United States.

On 22 May 2021, the  rover drove onto the Martian surface via the descent ramps on its landing platform. With the successful deployment of the rover, China became the second nation to accomplish this feat, after the United States. In addition, China is the first nation to carry out an orbiting, landing and rovering mission on Mars successfully on its maiden attempt. -1 is also the second mission to capture audio recordings on the Martian surface, after United States' Perseverance rover. The "smallsat" deployed by the  rover on the Martian surface consists of a "drop camera" which photographed both the rover itself as well as the -1 lander. With a mass of less than 1 kg, the -1 remote camera is the lightest artificial object on Mars as of May 2021. On December 31, 2021, the -1 orbiter deployed a second deployable camera (TDC-2) into Mars orbit which captured photographs of the -1 in orbit to celebrate its achievement of the year and a selfie stick payload was deployed to its working position on orbiter to take images of the orbiter's components and Chinese flag on 30 January 2022 to celebrate the Chinese New Year. In September 2022, the mission was awarded the World Space Award by the International Astronautical Federation.

The -1 mission was the second of three Martian exploration missions launched during the July 2020 window, after the United Arab Emirates Space Agency's Hope orbiter, and before NASA's Mars 2020 mission, which landed the Perseverance rover with the attached Ingenuity helicopter drone.

Nomenclature 
China's planetary exploration program is officially dubbed the " Series". "Tianwen-1"  is the program's first mission, and subsequent planetary missions will be numbered sequentially. The name  means "questions to heaven" or "quest for heavenly truth", from the same classical poem written by Qu Yuan (340–278 BC), an ancient Chinese poet. -1's rover is named , after a Chinese mytho-historical figure usually associated with fire and light. The name was chosen through an online poll held from January to February 2021.

Earlier attempt 
China's Mars program started in partnership with Russia. In November 2011, the Russian spacecraft Fobos-Grunt, destined for Mars and Phobos, was launched from Baikonur Cosmodrome. The Russian spacecraft carried with it an attached secondary spacecraft, the Yinghuo-1, which was intended to become China's first Mars orbiter (Fobos-Grunt also carried experiments from the Bulgarian Academy of Sciences and the American Planetary Society). However, Fobos-Grunt's main propulsion unit failed to boost the Mars-bound stack from its initial Earth parking orbit and the combined multinational spacecraft and experiments eventually reentered the atmosphere of Earth in January 2012. In 2014, China subsequently began an independent Mars project.

Mission overview 

The new Mars spacecraft, consisting of an orbiter and a lander with an attached rover, was developed by the China Aerospace Science and Technology Corporation (CASC) and is managed by the National Space Science Centre (NSSC) in Beijing. The mission was formally approved in 2016.

On 14 November 2019, CNSA invited some foreign embassies and international organizations to witness hovering and obstacle avoidance test for the Mars Lander of China's first Mars exploration mission at the extraterrestrial celestial landing test site. It was the first public appearance of China's Mars exploration mission.

As the mission preparation proceeded, in April 2020, the mission was formally named "-1".

On , -1 was launched from Wenchang Spacecraft Launch Site on the island of Hainan atop a Long March 5 heavy-lift launch vehicle.

In September 2020, the -1 orbiter deployed the -1 First Deployable Camera (TDC-1), a small satellite with two cameras that took photos of and tested a radio connection with -1. Its mission was to photograph the -1 orbiter and the lander's heat shield. Due to the time when it was deployed,  it trajectory predicted to do a flyby of Mars with that happening around the orbit insertion date.

During its cruise to Mars, the spacecraft completed four trajectory correction maneuvers plus an additional maneuver to alter its heliocentric orbital inclination; it also performed self diagnostics on multiple payloads. After payload checkouts, the spacecraft began scientific operations with the Mars Energetic Particle Analyzer, mounted on the orbiter, which transmitted initial data back to ground control.

The lander/rover portion of the mission began its Martian landing attempt on 14 May 2021. About nine minutes after the aeroshell housing the lander/rover combination entered the Martian atmosphere, the lander (carrying the rover) safely touched down in the Utopia Planitia region on Mars. After a period spent conducting system checkouts and other planning activities (including taking engineering images of itself), the lander deployed the  rover for independent surface operations. This rover is powered by solar panels and will probe the Martian surface with radar and conduct chemical analyses on the soil; it will also look for biomolecules and biosignatures.

Mission objectives 
This is the CNSA's first interplanetary mission, as well as its first independent probe to Mars. The primary goal is therefore to validate China's deep space communications and control technologies, as well as the Administration's ability to successfully orbit and land spacecraft.

From a scientific point of view, the mission must meet five objectives:
 Study the geological structure of Mars and that structure's historical evolution. To do this, the probe will analyze topographical data from characteristic regions such as dry riverbeds, the reliefs of volcanoes, glaciers at the poles, areas affected by wind erosion, etc. The two cameras present on the orbiter are dedicated to this objective.
 Study the characteristics of both the surface and underground layers of Martian soil, as well as the distribution of water ice. This is the role of the radars present on the orbiter and the rover.
 Study the composition and type of rocks on the Martian surface, carbonate minerals present in ancient lakes, rivers, and other landscapes resulting from the past presence of water on the planet, and weathering mineral such as hematites, lamellar silicates, sulphate hydrates and perchlorate. The spectrometers on board the orbiter and the rover as well as the multispectral camera are dedicated to this objective.
 Study the ionosphere, the climate, the seasons, and more generally the atmosphere of Mars, both in its near-space environment and on its surface. This is the role of the two particle detectors present on the orbiter as well as of the rover's weather station.
 Study the internal structure of Mars, its magnetic field, the history of its geological evolution, the internal distribution of its mass, and its gravitational field. The magnetometers as well as the radars present on the orbiter and the rover are dedicated to this objective.

The aims of the mission include searching for evidence of current and past life, producing surface maps, characterizing soil composition and water ice distribution, and examining the Martian atmosphere, particularly its ionosphere.

The mission also serves as a technology demonstration that will be needed for an anticipated Mars sample-return mission proposed for the 2030s.  will also cache rock and soil samples for retrieval by the later sample-return mission, and the orbiter will make it possible to locate a caching site.

Mission planning 

In late 2019, the Xi'an Aerospace Propulsion Institute, a subsidiary of CASC, stated that the performance and control of the future spacecraft's propulsion system has been verified and had passed all requisite pre-flight tests, including tests for hovering, hazard avoidance, deceleration and landing. The main component of the lander's propulsion system consists of a single engine that provides  of thrust. The spacecraft's supersonic parachute system had also been successfully tested.

CNSA initially focused on the Chryse Planitia and Elysium Mons regions of Mars in its search for possible landing sites. However, in September 2019 during a joint meeting in Geneva, in Switzerland, of the European Planetary Science Congress-Division for Planetary Sciences, the presenters announced that two preliminary sites in the Utopia Planitia region of Mars have instead been chosen for the anticipated landing attempt, with each site having a landing ellipse of approximately 100 by 40 kilometres.

In July 2020, CNSA provided landing coordinates of 110.318° East longitude and 24.748° North latitude, within the southern portion of Utopia Planitia, as the specific primary landing site. The area was chosen for being both of scientific interest and being safe enough for landing attempts. Simulated landings have been performed as part of mission preparations by the Beijing Institute of Space Mechanics and Electricity.

By 23 January 2020, the Long March 5 Y4 rocket's hydrogen-oxygen engine had completed a 100-seconds test, which was the last engine test prior to the final assembly of the launch vehicle. It successfully launched on 23 July 2020.

Entering Mars orbit 
The three -1 spacecraft were launched by Long March 5 Heavy-lift launch vehicle on 23 July 2020. Having traveled for about seven months, it entered Mars orbit on 10 February 2021 by performing a burn of its engines to slow down just enough to be captured by Mars' gravitational pull. The orbiter spent several months scanning and imaging the surface of Mars to refine the target landing zone for the lander/rover.

Orbital elements

Landing on Mars

Landing area selection
The landing area selection was based on two major criteria:
 Engineering feasibility, including latitude, altitude, slope, surface condition, rock distribution, local wind speed, visibility requirements during the EDL process.
 Scientific objectives, including geology, soil structure and water ice distribution, surface elements, mineral, and rock distribution, magnetic field detection.

Three initial areas were selected by the site selection team after a global survey of Mars; the three areas were: Amazonis Planitia, Chryse Planitia, and Utopia Planitia. All three candidate landing areas were between five degrees North and thirty degrees North latitude.

According to the site selection team, Amazonis Planitia was dropped from consideration upon further analysis due to the area's small thermal inertias and the possible presence of thick dust in the region; Chryse Planitia was eliminated next due to its rough terrain in terms of elevations, slopes, crater densities, and rock abundances. The target landing regions in Utopia Planitia were favored by the selection team also because they present higher chances of finding evidence for the possible presence of ancient ocean on the northern lowlands of Mars.

The primary target region was further constrained in extent using the high-resolution camera (HiRIC) on board the Tianwen-1 orbiter after it entered Martian orbit in February 2021. The HiRIC camera collected high resolution stereo images of the primary landing region; these images were built into mosaics of varying resolutions (e.g. digital elevation models with a resolution of 5 meters per pixel, and maps for automatic crater detection with a resolution of 0.7 meters per pixel.) The accuracy of some of the HiRIC image results were evaluated by comparing them with images generated by the cameras on the Mars Reconnaissance Orbiter.

Using the HiRIC mosaics, the selection team conducted various terrain analyses on potential candidate landing ellipses within the primary target region in an iterative manner; these analyses included the determination of the candidate ellipse's average slope, the percentage of slope with an angle greater than 8%, average rock abundance, the percentage of area within the candidate ellipse with a rock abundance greater than 10%, and the percentage of cratered area. A 'hazard index' is then distilled from the analyses for each candidate ellipse. Cadidate ellipse 16, with the lowest hazard index, emerged as the paimary target (candidate ellipse 128, with the next lowest hazard index, was the backup). See the following figure produced by the landing selection team intended to illustrate the calculation of the hazard indices for candidate ellipses 16 and 128.

The landing

At 23:18 UTC, on 14 May 2021, the -1 lander successfully landed in the preselected landing area in the southern part of the Mars Utopia Planitia. The landing phase began with the release of the protective capsule containing the lander/rover. The capsule made an atmospheric entry followed by a descent phase under parachute, after which the lander used retro-propulsion to soft-land on Mars.

On 19 May 2021, CNSA released for the first time images showing the preparation of the final transfer of the  rover from the platform of the lander to the Martian soil. The photographs show the solar panels of  already deployed while  is still perched on the lander along with two circular windows on the deck under which n-undecane wad stored in 10 containers that absorbs heat and melts during the daytime and solidifies and releases heat at night. The long delay for the publication of the first images is explained by the short periods of time when the  rover and the orbiter are in radio contact and can effectively communicate and transfer data.

The panoramic image is composed of 24 single shots taken by the NaTeCam before the rover was deployed to the Martian surface. The image reveals that the topography and rock abundance near the landing site was consistent with previous anticipations from the scientist on typical south Utopia Planitia features with small but widespread rocks, white wave patterns, and mud volcanoes.

Exploration of Martian surface 

On 22 May 2021 (02:40 UTC), the  rover descended from its lander onto the Martian surface to begin its scientific mission. The first images received on Earth after the rover deployment showed the empty landing platform and the extended rover-descent ramps. During its deployment, the Rover's instrument, Mars Climatic Station, recorded the sound, acting as the second martian sound instrument to record Martian sounds successfully after Mars 2020 Perseverance rover's microphones.

The  rover deployed a drop camera to the surface which was able to photograph both the  rover and the -1 lander.

After the rover deployment, the orbiter would serve as a telecommunications relay for the rover while continuing to conduct its own orbital observations of Mars.

On 12 July 2021, Zhurong visited the parachute and backshell dropped onto the Martian surface during its landing on 14 May.

On 15 August 2021, Zhurong officially completed its planned exploration tasks and will continue to drive towards the southern part of Utopia Planitia where it landed. On 18 August 2021, Zhurong outlived its lifespan of 90 sols and the Chinese scientists and engineers announced an extended expedition aiming to investigate an ancient coastal area on Mars.

From mid-September to late October 2021, both the -1 orbiter and  rover entered safe mode due to a communications blackout around solar conjunction. Both devices were back to active mode after the ending of the blackout.

On 20 May 2022, Zhurong was put into hibernation mode to prepare for the approaching sandstorms and Martian winter, and was programmed to self-awake at an appropriate temperature and sunlight condition.

On 27 February 2023, the initial results of the meteorological data from the first 325 sols of the mission were published in the journal Nature.

Instruments

Scientific instruments

To achieve the scientific objectives of the mission, the -1 orbiter is equipped with eight scientific instruments, while the  rover is equipped with six, which include:

Orbiter 

 Moderate Resolution Imaging Camera (MoRIC) with a resolution of 100 m from a 400 km altitude. It takes color photos in visible band.
 High Resolution Imaging Camera (HiRIC) with a resolution of 2.5 m from a 256 km altitude in panchromatic mode, 10 m in color mode.
 Mars Orbiter Magnetometer (MOMAG) is used to map Martian magnetic field.
 Mars Mineralogical Spectrometer (MMS) utilizes the visible and near infrared imaging spectrometer with detection wavelengths ranging from 0.45 to 3.4 µm to investigate and analyze the Martian surface composition. It also investigate the distribution of regolith types and subsurface structure of Mars.
 Mars Orbiter Scientific Investigation Radar (MOSIR) aims to explore the Martian surface and subsurface water-ice by means of the dual-polarization echo characteristics of radar.
 Mars Ion and Neutral Particle Analyzer (MINPA) measures the flux of ions in space environment, distinguishes the main ions and obtains their physical parameters such as the density, velocity and temperature.
 Mars Energetic Particle Analyzer (MEPA) obtains the energy spectrum, flux and elemental composition of energy electrons, protons, α particles and ions.
Unknown payload, likely the Mars Orbiter Status Monitoring Sensor (MOSMOS), to monitor and evaluate the condition of key components, the Chinese flag and the 2022 Winter Olympics and Paralympics logo on the orbiter.

rover 

 Mars Rover Magnetometer (RoMAG) obtains the fine-scale structures of crustal magnetic field based on mobile measurements on the Martian surface.
 Mars Climate Station (MCS) (also MMMI Mars Meteorological Measurement Instrument) measures the temperature, pressure, wind velocity and direction of the surface atmosphere, and a microphone to capture Martian sounds. During rover's deployment, it recorded the sound, acting as the second Martian sound instrument to record Martian sounds successfully after Mars 2020 Perseverance rover's microphones.
 Mars Surface Compound Detector (MarSCoDe) combines laser-induced breakdown spectroscopy (LIBS) and infrared spectroscopy
 Multispectral Camera (MSCam) Combined with MarSCoDe, MSCam investigates the mineral components to establish the relationship between Martian surface water environment and secondary mineral types, and to search for historical environmental conditions for the presence of liquid water.
 Navigation and Topography Cameras (NaTeCam) With 2048 × 2048 resolution, NaTeCam is used to construct topography maps, extract parameters such as slope, undulation and roughness, investigate geological structures, and conduct comprehensive analysis on the geological structure of the surface parameters.

Lander
The lander did not have a scientific payload, but carried a Mars Emergency Beacon designed to survive the force of a catastrophic crash. The beacon would have allowed critical engineering data to be collected to aid future design. The lander also carried the Chinese flag and 2022 Winter Olympics and Paralympics mascots with it like the orbiter.

Other instruments
 -1 Deployable Cameras, two secondary Payloads deployed in September 2020 in deep space and 31 December 2021 in Mars orbit respectively, that took photos of and tested a radio connection with -1. The first camera's mission was to photograph the -1 orbiter and the lander's heat shield while the other one had to image the orbiter and Northern Mars Ice Cap from Mars orbit.
 -1 Remote Camera, secondary Payload deployed on 1 June 2021 that took photos of and tested a wireless connection with Zhurong rover like the deployable cameras did with orbiter. Its mission was to take a group selfie of the Zhurong rover and the -1 lander. The photo was released on 11 June 2021, confirming their Martian landing success.

International collaborations 
Argentina's Comisión Nacional de Actividades Espaciales (CONAE) is collaborating on -1 by way of the Espacio Lejano tracking station installed in Las Lajas, Neuquén. The facility played a previous role in China's landing of the Chang'e 4 spacecraft on the far side of the Moon in January 2019.

France's Institut de Recherche en Astrophysique et Planétologie (IRAP) in Toulouse, in France, is collaborating on the  rover.  of IRAP said: 

The Austrian Research Promotion Agency (FFG) aided in the development of a magnetometer installed on the -1 orbiter. The Space Research Institute of the Austrian Academy of Sciences in Graz has confirmed the group's contribution to the -1 magnetometer and helped with the calibration of the flight instrument.

While the -1 orbiter will dispense commands to the  rover, the Mars Express orbiter of the European Space Agency could serve as a backup.

Reactions 
Chinese President and General Secretary of the Communist Party Xi Jinping stated in response to the landing: 

Thomas Zurbuchen, NASA Associate Administrator of US, tweeted his congratulations: 

Dmitry Rogozin, Director General of Roscosmos of Russia, praised China's successful mission: 

The European Space Agency tweeted their congratulations:

See also 

 
 
 Chinese Deep Space Network
 Exploration of Mars
 ESTRACK
 List of missions to Mars
 
 Emirates Mars Mission, UAE 2020 Mars mission with its Hope orbiter

Notes

References 

2020 in China
2021 on Mars
Articles containing video clips
Astrobiology space missions
Chinese space probes
July 2020 events in Asia
Mars rovers
Missions to Mars
Six-wheeled robots
Space probes launched in 2020
Spacecraft launched by Long March rockets